The 2002–03 season was Olympiacos's 44th consecutive season in the Alpha Ethniki and their 77th year in existence. The club were played their 6th consecutive season in the UEFA Champions League. In the beginning of the summertime Olympiacos named Greek Takis Lemonis coach.

Squad

Competitions

Alpha Ethniki

League standings

Results summary

Results by round

Results
Match dates not available

Olympiacos - AEK 1-2
Olympiacos - Akratitos Liosia 4-0
Olympiacos - Aris 1-0
Olympiacos - Egaleo 4-0
Olympiacos - Pas Giannina 2-1
Olympiacos - Ionikos 2-1
Olympiacos - Iraklis 6-0
Olympiacos - Kallithea 1-0
Olympiacos - OFI Crete 1-0
Olympiacos - Panachaiki 7-0
Olympiacos - Panathinaikos 3-0
Olympiacos - Panionios 3-0
Olympiacos - PAOK 4-3
Olympiacos - Proodeftiki 0-0
Olympiacos - Skoda Xanthi 1-1

AEK - Olympiacos 1-1
Akratitos - Olympiacos 2-5
Aris - Olympiacos 0-0
PAS Giannina - Olympiacos 0-3
Egaleo - Olympiacos 0-2
Ionikos - Olympiacos 2-2
Iraklis - Olympiacos 0-2
Kallithea - Olympiacos 1-4
OFI Crete - Olympiacos 0-1
Panachaiki - Olympiacos 1-4
Panathinaikos - Olympiacos 3-2
Panionios - Olympiacos 0-0
PAOK - Olympiacos 1-1
Proodeftiki - Olympiacos 1-3
Skoda Xanthi - Olympiacos 1-5

UEFA Champions League

Group stage

All times at CET

1All matches played at GSP Stadium in Nicosia, Cyprus after UEFA banned international matches from being played in Israel.

Team kit

|

|

References

External links 
 Official Website of Olympiacos Piraeus 

2002–03
Greek football clubs 2002–03 season
2002–03